Edward Manning (died 1756) was the speaker of the House of Assembly of Jamaica in 1755. He died on 6 December 1756.

See also
 List of speakers of the House of Assembly of Jamaica

References 

Year of birth missing
1756 deaths
Speakers of the House of Assembly of Jamaica
18th-century Jamaican people